The American Newspaper is a critical study of journalism conducted by Will Irwin from 1909 to 1910 spanning fourteen articles that discuss the origins, purposes, and principles that journalists should aspire to.  The article series appeared in Collier's in serialized form in 1911.

In his analysis, Irwin raised awareness among the public as to the corruption and moral decay of newspapers of the era.  He covered both negative and positive aspects of newspaper coverage, and even attempted to define what is "news", a topic that is still debatable to this day among journalists in the field.  He remarked the role of newspapers, saying that "The newspaper which has absorbed and made systematic many things that went by rule of thumb in cruder stages of society, has generally taken over this legislative power of public opinion, this executive power of gossip."

Irwin's study is still referenced today for students of journalism.

Bibliography
Hudson, Robert V. Will Irwin's Pioneering Criticism of the Press (1970)

References

Books about media bias